Matti Hiltunen (born 26 January 1933) is a Finnish footballer. He played in 19 matches for the Finland national football team from 1953 to 1963. He was also named in Finland's squad for the Group 2 qualification tournament for the 1954 FIFA World Cup.

References

1933 births
Living people
Finnish footballers
Finland international footballers
Place of birth missing (living people)
Association footballers not categorized by position